Juan Miguel Gob de Guzman (born September 9, 1988), popularly known by his screen name JM de Guzman, is a Filipino actor, mixed martial artist, model and singer. He is currently working as an exclusive talent of Star Magic.

Early life and career
JM de Guzman's mother is Han Carteciano Gob while his father is Ronniel De Guzman. JM started his career as a print and TV model. He was a cast in Ang TV 2 (as JM "Butik" de Guzman), where his batchmates include Shaina Magdayao and Denise Laurel. During his elementary and high school years, he studied at Lourdes School of Quezon City.

In 2005, he was accepted at the University of the Philippines in Diliman, where he took up Certificate in Theater Arts, majoring in Performance Studies. He apprenticed as an actor and production staff under the university's college-based theater group, Dulaang UP.

In 2006, he joined the UP Wrestling Club and eventually became its president and a decorated athlete. He won medals in various competitions sanctioned by the Wrestling Association of the Philippines, wherein he represented the UP Wrestling Club or the Quezon City Wrestling Team. In 2007, he won a silver medal for Quezon City during the Philippine Olympic Festival – National Capital Region qualifying round.

He also competed in amateur mixed martial arts (MMA) as representative of S.P.R.A.W.L. – MMA Team. He logged a 1–1 fight record: he lost his match in the 2007 URCC University and won in the 2009 S.P.R.A.W.L and BRAWL amateur MMA event.

He was also elected as the Deputy Grand Triskelion of the Tau Gamma Phi fraternity, UP Diliman chapter.

De Guzman auditioned and was later cast in the 2009 Cinemalaya film Last Supper Number 3. The independent film was where Direk Lauren Dyogi, business unit head of ABS-CBN. Dyogi found him and asked to audition for Midnight Phantom. He passed the audition and starred as the best friend of Rafael Rosell who plays the title role.

He was cast in the new PHR series Alyna and paired with his Midnight Phantom co-actor Charee Pineda who has been claimed having chemistry by the fans.

His biggest break so far is playing the lead role as Gabriel Maglayon, originally played by actor Rico Yan, in ABS-CBN's 2011 remake of Mula sa Puso. Upon getting the role, De Guzman has proven that he is one of the most-promising young actors these days, as he also present a very good chemistry with the cast, especially with Lauren Young, who plays Via Pereira, his character's love interest in the series.

Now a contract artist of Star Magic, he played the lead role of Angelito in Angelito: Batang Ama, paired with Charee Pineda, which aired from November 2011 to April 2012. With the success of Angelito: Batang Ama, De Guzman was paired up again with Pineda for the follow-up teleserye entitled Angelito: Ang Bagong Yugto that aired from July 2012 to December 2012.

His last appearance on ABS-CBN in the 2015 romantic comedy series All of Me with Albert Martinez, Yen Santos and Arron Villaflor. De Guzman's Star Magic talent contract expired on November 16, 2015.

After a two-year hiatus, ABS-CBN promoted de Guzman's return starting December 6, 2017, before signing his contract to Star Magic.

In February 2018, he became a member of the acoustic group ASAP Jambayan, replacing Kaye Cal who left the group after prior commitments.

In 2018, he was cast as leading man in PHR series Araw Gabi and paired with former Girltrends member Barbie Imperial who has been claimed having a strong chemistry with him, form a loveteam called "JuanBie" by fans.

On November 11, 2018, he interpreted Sa mga Bituin na Lang Ibubulong for Himig Handog 2018, composed by Kyle Raphael Borbon. However, due to sickness, he was unable to participate on the Grand Finals of Himig Handog 2018, being substituted by Jason Dy during the live finale performance on ASAP.

Personal life
De Guzman is a cousin of fellow singer Klarisse de Guzman, first runner-up of The Voice of the Philippines (season 1).

In late 2013 to 2014, De Guzman underwent rehab due to drug abuse and entered a rehab facility for 17 months. Prior to that, he was in a relationship with actress Jessy Mendiola for 2 years. They broke up some time in 2013 citing De Guzman's drug abuse as the main contributor of the break-up. The premature cancellation of his show Angelito: Ang Bagong Yugto was said to be caused by De Guzman's eventual erratic behavior on set. His supposed portrayal of Pedro Calungsod for the 2013 Metro Manila Film Festival entry film Pedro Calungsod: Batang Martir was also cancelled and was replaced by actor Rocco Nacino to take on the titular role.

In late 2014, after De Guzman's completion of his rehabilitation and a hiatus for over a year, he made a showbiz comeback and rekindled his relationship with Mendiola which lasted for 5 months before breaking up for the second time. His reported problematic attitude on the set of the 2015 Metro Manila Film Festival entry Walang Forever led to his replacement in the movie by actor Jericho Rosales.

In 2015, after a series of disturbing and cryptic messages posted on his Instagram account, De Guzman later apologized and stated via Instagram post that Mendiola was not the reason for their second breakup nor she and station ABS-CBN would be blamed for his recent actions and behavior. He further claimed that he has been recently struggling with anxiety attacks, depression and bipolar disorder.

Filmography

Television
{| class="wikitable sortable"
! Year !! Title !! Role !! Network
|-
| 2001–2002 || Ang TV 2 || Various roles || ABS-CBN
|-
| 2003 || Magpakailanman: Ricky Reyes Story || Totoy Reyes || GMA Network
|-
| 2008 || Pelikuletran: New Arrival  (Letran Short Film Festival) || Miko  || rowspan="26" | ABS-CBN
|-
| rowspan=5 | 2010 || Precious Hearts Romances Presents: Alyna || Yael 
|-
| Precious Hearts Romances Presents: Kristine || Nathaniel Cervantes 
|-
| Precious Hearts Romances Presents: Midnight Phantom || Mike Castillo
|-
| Precious Hearts Romances Presents: The Substitute Bride || Jimmy 
|-
| Banana Split || Himself 
|-
| 2011–2015 || ASAP || Himself (Boys R Boys, ASAP Jambayan)
|-
| rowspan=4|2011 || I Dare You || Himself (as Kapamilya Challenger)
|-
| Maalaala Mo Kaya: Balot – The Marcelito Pomoy Story || Marcelito Pomoy 
|-
| Mula sa Puso || Gabriel Maglayon
|-
| Maalaala Mo Kaya: Pasaporte || Jay
|-
| 2011–2012 || Angelito: Batang Ama || Angelito Santos
|-
| rowspan=3|2012 || Maalaala Mo Kaya: Kurtina || Acmad
|-
| Angelito: Ang Bagong Yugto || Angelito Santos 
|-
| Sarah G. Live || Himself (Guest Co-Host) 
|-
| rowspan=3|2014 || Maalaala Mo Kaya: Simcard || Joeven 
|-
| Hawak Kamay || Brian Agustin
|-
| Ipaglaban Mo: Ibigay Ang Aming Karapatan || Andoy
|-
| rowspan="3" |2015 || Kapamilya, Deal or No Deal || Himself
|-
| Maalaala Mo Kaya: Bota || Paul Manuel
|-
| Ipaglaban Mo: Totoong Mahal Kita || Emman
|-
| 2015–2016 || All of Me || Edong / young adult Manuel Figueras
|-
| 2018 || Precious Hearts Romances Presents: Araw Gabi || Adrian Olvidar
|-
| rowspan="2" |2019 || Ipaglaban Mo: Impostor || Cedric Valdez
|-
| Maalaala Mo Kaya: Black Belt || Ramon "The Bicolano" Gonzales
|-
| 2019–2020 || Pamilya Ko || Francisco "Chico" Mabunga 
|-
| rowspan="2"| 2021 || Init sa Magdamag || Peterson Alvarez (antagonist) || Kapamilya Channel  A2Z
|-
| Maalaala Mo Kaya: Quarantine Pass || Rizaldy Faller || rowspan="4" |Kapamilya Channel
|-
| rowspan="2"| 2022
| Maalaala Mo Kaya: Loogbook || rowspan="2" | Chris 
|-
| Maalaala Mo Kaya: Selda 
|-
| 2023 || Linlang ||
|}

Film

Discography
Studio albums

Awards and nominations

References

External links
 JM de Guzman doesn't want to be known as a ‘Coco Martin wannabe’. ABS-CBN Interactive Inc.
 URCCMMA.com profile''
 

1988 births
Filipino male child actors
Filipino male television actors
21st-century Filipino male singers
Living people
Star Magic
University of the Philippines Diliman alumni
Filipino male film actors
Male actors from Manila